Wenvoe railway station is a former railway station in Wenvoe in south Wales. It was on the Barry Railway between Creigiau and Cadoxton, which ran broadly north–south through Wenvoe. It had two platforms with passing loops to the south on both the up and down lines for goods and mineral trains to allow passenger trains to pass. To the north of the station was Wenvoe Tunnel, 1 mile and 108 yards long emerging just before Drope Junction. The northern portal is located slightly to the west of the A4232 by-pass.

The station closed in 1962 and the line was abandoned six months later. The site of the station buildings and yard is now a private residence and is not accessible to the public.

References

Disused railway stations in Cardiff
Railway stations in Great Britain opened in 1896
Railway stations in Great Britain closed in 1962
Former Barry Railway stations
1896 establishments in Wales
1962 disestablishments in Wales